Duncan Kirkland McRae (August 16, 1820 – February 12, 1888) was an American politician from North Carolina. After studying law, he served as attorney, diplomat and state legislator. He was an officer in the Confederate States Army during the American Civil War, the wounds received in it complicating his later life. McRae was also a newspaper editor.

Early life and education
McRae was born in Fayetteville, North Carolina, the son of John McRae (1793–1880), Fayetteville's postmaster in the 1840s and 1850s. In 1825 the five-years old Duncan held the welcome speech at the visit of the Marquis de Lafayette. He attended the University of Virginia, located in Charlottesville, and the College of William & Mary in Williamsburg. Back in North Carolina he studied law under Judge Robert Strange, was admitted to the bar in 1841 and briefly practiced in Oxford before becoming a courier to Mexico for the State Department.

Political career
In 1842 young McRae was elected into the North Carolina House of Commons as Democratic representative for his native Cumberland County; serving a single term until 1843.  Then he became a U.S. District Attorney, gaining a reputation as sharp lawmen and outstanding speaker. Partnering with Perrin Busbee he founded a short-lived newspaper, the Democratic Signal, in 1843. It was based in Raleigh, where he had moved to. He resigned in 1850 and moved to Wilmington the next year.

McRae served as Consul to Paris with the U.S. Ambassador to France during the administration of U.S. President Franklin Pierce from 1853 to 1857; he then relocated to New Bern. In 1858 he became a candidate for the governorship of North Carolina. He left the Democratic Party and gained support from remnants of the Whig Party, but was criticized for his changing political positions. He became an Independent Democrat campaigning as the Land Distribution Democratic nominee, calling for public lands given by North Carolina to the federal government in 1790 to be sold and the money granted to North Carolina. He lost his candidacy to John Willis Ellis by a wide margin.

Civil War
When the American Civil War began Governor Ellis, shortly before he died in office, appointed McRae as commanding officer of the 5th North Carolina Infantry Regiment with the rank of Colonel in the Confederate States Army. During July the regiment was sent northwards to join the Army of the Potomac and was assigned to the brigade of Brig.Gen. James Longstreet. It participated in the First Battle of Manassas though McRae was absent ill. He commanded his regiment, now in the brigade of Jubal Early, during the Peninsula Campaign and fought in the Battle of Williamsburg. There he was wounded while leading a charge against troops under Gen. Winfield Scott Hancock. As the wound was only minor he stayed on the field and temporarily took command of the brigade when Gen. Early was wounded; later relinquishing command to Samuel Garland Jr. McRae fought in the Seven Days Battles but afterwards sickness and complications from his wound forced him leave his unit again.

Colonel McRae was able to return in time to command his regiment during the Maryland Campaign. He took over the brigade again after the death of Samuel Garland Jr. at South Mountain, leading it into the maelstrom of the Battle of Antietam where it nearly perished. McRae himself was badly wounded but again stayed with his command until after the battle when he was hospitalized. When the recuperating colonel was passed over for promotion, the later going to Alfred Iverson Jr., he resigned his commission; effective on November 13, 1862.

McRae wrote letters describing the actions of the Maryland Campaign that survived as of today. In particular, he noted that at the Battle of South Mountain he was able to keep Garland's brigade fighting for two more hours after Samuel Garland death. At Antietam, he admitted that, "the unaccountable panic occurred, when I was left along on the field, with only Capatin Withers of Caswell and perhaps one other officer, and I had just gotten off, when I encountered ... General Lee, and it was while, with him I was trying to get some men out of the Hay Stacks that a piece of shell struck me in the forehead."

In 1863 the new Governor of North Carolina, Zebulon B. Vance, appointed McRae a special envoy and purchase agent; sending him to southern Europe to find a market for cotton and to procure supplies. After his return, and a failed run for the Confederate Congress, McRae found another Raleigh-based newspaper, The Confederate.

Later life
When the war ended McRae moved to Memphis, Tennessee, practiced law as partner of McRae & Sneed and published a law journal. After 14 years in Tennessee he moved back to Wilmington. In 1880 McRae gave a speech in favor of Winfield S. Hancock, his former adversary during the Battle of Williamsburg, when Hancock was running for the U.S. presidency. He became a bitter critic of the Civil War, though in private, writing on August 21, 1885 to D.H. Hill, who queried him on the battles of the past:

McRae's frail health and reappearing complications from his war wounds made him relocate - first to Chicago, then to New York City. He died in Brooklyn on February 12, 1888, and was buried on Woodlawn Cemetery.

Family
McRae married Louise Virginia Henry, the daughter of Judge Louis D. Henry of Raleigh, on October 8, 1845. They had three daughters; Margaret Kirkland, Virginia Henry, and Marie.

See also

 List of College of William & Mary alumni
 List of University of Virginia people
 List of people from North Carolina
 North Carolina in the American Civil War

References

Further reading
 Clark, Walter. Fifth Regiment. In Histories of the Several Regiments and Battalions from North Carolina, in the Great War 1861-1865. Raleigh: E.M. Uzzell, Printer and Binder. 1901, p. 281-285.
 
 Appendix to the life and times of Duncan K. McRae by George N. Sanders with his letter of resignation to Governor Vance as colonel of the 5th North Carolina Regiment, collection of the Boston Athenaeum

External links
 
 

1820 births
1888 deaths
Place of death missing
19th-century American diplomats
19th-century American newspaper founders
19th-century American politicians
American expatriates in France
College of William & Mary alumni
Members of the North Carolina House of Representatives
Confederate States Army officers
People from Chicago
Politicians from Fayetteville, North Carolina
People from Memphis, Tennessee
Politicians from Raleigh, North Carolina
Politicians from Wilmington, North Carolina
People of North Carolina in the American Civil War
Presidency of Franklin Pierce
University of Virginia alumni